A lie is a type of deception, an untruth or not telling the truth. 

Lie, LIE or A Lie may also refer to:

Places
 Interstate 495 (New York), also called the Long Island Expressway or LIE
Liechtenstein, IOC country code LIE

People
Lie (surname)
Saint Lié (died 533)

Films
Lie (film) (Telugu లై), a 2017 Indian film
L.I.E. (film), a 2001 LGBT film revolving around the Long Island Expressway

Music
"Lie" (Black Light Burns song)
"Lie", a song by Dream Theater from Awake
"Lie", a song by Halsey from Hopeless Fountain Kingdom
"Lie", a song by BTS from Wings
"Lie" (Lukas Graham song)
Lie (NF song)
"Lie", a song by T-ara from Absolute First Album
"A Lie", a song by French Montana
"A lie", a song by B1A4 from Good Timing, 2016
Lie: The Love and Terror Cult, an album by Charles Manson

Mathematics
Carathéodory–Jacobi–Lie theorem
Law of iterated expectations, or law of total expectation, initialized as LIE, a probability, statistical concept
Lie algebra
Lie bracket of vector fields
Lie derivative
Lie group
Group of Lie type
Lie sphere geometry
Lie theory

Other uses
Lie (obstetrics), an obstetrical term for the axis of the foetus
 Lie, topography or surface characteristics at a golf course
Logical Intuitive Extrovert, or LIE, in socionics
Lying (position), the recumbent position of the human body

See also
Liar (disambiguation)
Lye (disambiguation)
The Lie (disambiguation)
LI3 (disambiguation)